Estádio Acrísio Cruz is an association football stadium in Botucatu, on the countryside of São Paulo, Brazil. The stadium holds 5.000 people. It was inaugurated in 1945.

References

Acrísio Cruz
Acrísio Cruz
Botucatu